The ceremonial county of Buckinghamshire, which includes the unitary authorities of Buckinghamshire and the
City of Milton Keynes, is divided into 7 parliamentary constituencies
– 1 borough constituency and 6 county constituencies.

Constituencies

2010 boundary changes 
Under the Fifth Periodic Review of Westminster constituencies, the Boundary Commission for England decided to retain Buckinghamshire's constituencies for the 2010 election, making minor changes to realign constituency boundaries with the boundaries of current local government wards, and to reduce the electoral disparity between constituencies. The changes included the return of Great Missenden to Chesham and Amersham, Hazlemere to Wycombe and Aston Clinton to Buckingham. In addition, Marlow was transferred from Wycombe to Beaconsfield and Princes Risborough from Aylesbury to Buckingham. The boundary between the two Milton Keynes constituencies was realigned and they were renamed as Milton Keynes North and Milton Keynes South.

Proposed boundary changes 
See 2023 Periodic Review of Westminster constituencies for further details.

Following the abandonment of the Sixth Periodic Review (the 2018 review), the Boundary Commission for England formally launched the 2023 Review on 5 January 2021. Initial proposals were published on 8 June 2021 and, following two periods of public consultation, revised proposals were published on 8 November 2022. Final proposals will be published by 1 July 2023.

The commission has proposed that the number of seats in the combined area of Buckinghamshire and Milton Keynes be increased from seven to eight with the creation of a new constituency named Mid Buckinghamshire. This leads to significant changes elsewhere, particularly in Milton Keynes, with the creation of a cross-authority constituency named Buckingham and Bletchley, replacing the existing Buckingham seat.

The following constituencies are proposed:

Containing electoral wards from Buckinghamshire (unitary authority)

 Aylesbury
 Beaconsfield
 Buckingham and Bletchley (part)
 Chesham and Amersham
 Mid Buckinghamshire
 Wycombe

Containing electoral wards from Milton Keynes

 Buckingham and Bletchley (part)
 Milton Keynes North
 Milton Keynes South

Results history 
Primary data source: House of Commons research briefing - General election results from 1918 to 2019

2019 
The number of votes cast for each political party who fielded candidates in constituencies comprising Buckinghamshire in the 2019 general election were as follows:

Percentage votes 
Note that before 1983 Buckinghamshire included the Eton and Slough areas of what is now Berkshire.

1pre-1979: Liberal Party; 1983 & 1987 - SDP-Liberal Alliance

2Standing in Buckingham, unopposed by the 3 main parties.

* Included in Other

Accurate vote percentages for the 1918 election cannot be obtained because some candidates stood unopposed.

Seats 

1John Bercow

Maps

Historical representation by party
A cell marked → (with a different colour background to the preceding cell) indicates that the previous MP continued to sit under a new party name.

1885 to 1945

1945 to 1983

1983 to present

See also
 List of parliamentary constituencies in the South East (region)
 History of parliamentary constituencies and boundaries in Buckinghamshire

Notes

References

 
Buckinghamshire
Politics of Buckinghamshire
Buckinghamshire-related lists